Bougainville's scaly-toed gecko (Lepidodactylus mutahi ) is a species of lizard in the family Gekkonidae. The species is endemic to Bougainville Island.

Etymology
The specific name, mutahi, refers to the Mutahi area in northeastern Bougainville Island.

Description

Reproduction
L. mutahi is oviparous.

References

Further reading
Brown, Walter C.; Parker, Fred (1977). "Lizards of the Genus Lepidodactylus (Gekkonidae) from the Indo-Australian Archipelago and the Islands of the Pacific, with Descriptions of New Species". Proceedings of the California Academy of Sciences, Fourth Series 41 (8): 253–265. (Lepidodactylus mutahi, new species, pp. 259–260).

Lepidodactylus
Reptiles described in 1977